The Jieffeco Model 1911 was a semi automatic pistol manufactured in Belgium.

See also
List of pistols

Underbarrel pistols
FN M1900
Semmerling XLM

References

 Brandt, Jakob H. “Magazine der Selbstladepistolen Jieffeco und Melior”. Deutsche Waffen Journal, June 1995.
 Daubresse, Alain.  Les armuriers Liègeois a travers leurs réalisations.  Alain Daubresse: 2014.
 Daubresse, Alain.  littlegun.be
 Gadisseur, Guy and Druart, Michel. Le Qui est Qui: de l’Armurierie liégeoise, 1800–1950, Tome 1, Editions du Pecari: 2005.
 Hogg, Ian and Walter, John. Pistols of the World, 4th Edition. Krause Publications, Iola, WI: 2004.
 Hogg, Ian V. and Weeks, John. Pistols of the World. Arms & Armour Press, London: 1978.
 Matthews, J. Howard, Firearms Identification.  Charles C. Thomas, Springfield, Illinois: 1962.
 Olson, John, Editor. Famous Automatic Pistols and Revolvers, Volume 2. Jolex.
 Schroeder, Joseph J. Jr., Editor.  Arms of the World 1911: The Fabulous ALFA Catalogue of Arms and the Outdoors. Follett Publishing Company, Chicago: 1972.

Semi-automatic pistols 1901–1909
.25 ACP semi-automatic pistols
.32 ACP semi-automatic pistols